Kariz or Kahriz may refer to:

Turpan water system

Places in Afghanistan
Kariz, Bamyan
Kariz, Faryab
Kariz, Kandahar
Kariz, Vardak 
Kariz, Vardak 
Kariz, Zabol 
Kariz, Zabol

Places in Iran

Ardabil Province
Kahriz, Ardabil, a village in Nir County

East Azerbaijan Province
Kahriz, East Azerbaijan, a village in Meyaneh County

Hamadan Province
Kahriz, Hamadan, a village in Malayer County
Kahriz, Kabudarahang, a village in Kabudarahang County
Kahriz, alternate name of Kahriz-e Hoseynabad-e Nazem, a village in Malayer County
Kahriz, alternate name of Kahriz-e Salah ol Din, a village in Nahavand County
Kahriz, alternate name of Kahriz-e Salim, a village in Nahavand County

Isfahan Province
Kariz, Isfahan, a village in Lenjan County

Kermanshah Province
Kahriz-e Olya, Harsin, a village in Harsin County
Kahriz-e Bid Sorkh, a village in Kangavar County
Kahriz-e Kalan, a village in Kangavar County
Kahriz, Poshtdarband, a village in Kermanshah County
Kahriz, Qarah Su, a village in Kermanshah County
Kahriz-e Kur Bolagh, a village in Kermanshah County
Kahriz-e Qaleh Kohneh, a village in Kermanshah County
Kahriz-e Sofla, a village in Kermanshah County
Kahriz, Sahneh, a village in Sahneh County
Kahriz, Sonqor, a village in Sonqor County

Khuzestan Province
Kahriz, Khuzestan, a village in Izeh County

Kurdistan Province
Kahriz, Kurdistan, a village in Bijar County

Lorestan Province
Kahriz, Azna, a village in Azna County, Lorestan Province
Kahriz, Borujerd, a village in Borujerd County, Lorestan Province
Kahriz, Khorramabad, a village in Khorramabad County, Lorestan Province
Kahriz, Selseleh, a village in Selseleh County, Lorestan Province
Kahriz Gizhian, a village in Kuhdasht County, Lorestan Province
Kahriz-e Jadid, a village in Khorramabad County, Lorestan Province
Kahriz-e Sefid, a village in Azna County, Lorestan Province
Kahriz-e Varvasht, a village in Delfan County, Lorestan Province

North Khorasan Province
Kariz, Bojnord, a village in Bojnord County, North Khorasan Province
Kariz, Maneh and Samalqan, a village in Maneh and Samalqan County, North Khorasan Province

Razavi Khorasan Province
Kariz-e Bedaq, a village in Fariman County
Kariz-e Diklan, a village in Fariman County
Kariz-e Hajj Mohammad Jan, a village in Fariman County
Kariz Sukhteh-ye Dowlatabad, a village in Fariman County
Kariz, Kashmar, a village in Kashmar County
Kariz-e Sabah, a village in Nishapur County
Kariz, Razavi Khorasan, a city in Taybad County
Kariz-e Omar, a village in Torbat-e Jam County
Kariz Darreh, a village in Torbat-e Jam County
Kariz Divaneh, a village in Torbat-e Jam County
Kariz Kohandel, a village in Torbat-e Jam County
Kariz-e Bala, a village in Zaveh County
Kariz-e Geli, a village in Zaveh County

Semnan Province
 Kariz, Semnan, a village in Shahrud County

West Azerbaijan Province
 Kahriz, Chaypareh, a village in Chaypareh County
 Kahriz-e Qaleh Daresi, a village in Maku County
 Kahriz-e Ajam, a village in Naqadeh County
 Kahriz, Salmas, a village in Salmas County
 Kahriz, Shahin Dezh, a village in Shahin Dezh County
 Kahriz, Urmia, a village in Urmia County

Yazd Province
 Kariz-e Bala, Yazd, a village in Taft County
 Kariz-e Pain, a village in Taft County

Zanjan Province
 Kahriz, Ijrud, a village in Ijrud County
 Kahriz, Mahneshan, a village in Mahneshan County
 Kahriz, Zanjan, a village in Khodabandeh County

other
Kariz-e Now (disambiguation)
Kahriz-e Olya (disambiguation)

See also

Karie (disambiguation)